At least two warships of Japan have been named Uzushio:

, an  launched in 1970 and struck in 1987.
, an  launched in 1998

Japanese Navy ship names
Japan Maritime Self-Defense Force ship names